Pallaviciniaceae is a widely distributed family of liverworts in the order Pallaviciniales.  All species are thallose, typically organized as a thick central costa (midvein), each side with a broad wing of tissue one cell in thickness.  All species are dioicous.  The greatest diversity is in Australasia, with some species endemic to that region, though species belonging to the family may be found on every continent except Antarctica.

Species
As accepted by GBIF;

Evolutionary history
One of the oldest known bryophytes is Pallaviciniites of the Devonian, discovered in New York. It bears strong similarities to extant thallus liverwort genus Pallavicinia, hence the name.

References

Liverwort families
Pallaviciniales